Amphiasma is a genus of 7 species of flowering plants in the family Rubiaceae. It was described by Cornelis Bremekamp in 1952. The genus is found from southern Tanzania to Namibia.

Species
 Amphiasma benguellense (Hiern) Bremek. - Angola, Namibia
 Amphiasma divaricatum (Engl.) Bremek. - Namibia
 Amphiasma luzuloides (K.Schum.) Bremek. - Tanzania, Malawi
 Amphiasma merenskyanum Bremek. - Angola, Namibia
 Amphiasma micranthum (Chiov.) Bremek. - Angola
 Amphiasma redheadii Bremek. - Zambia
 Amphiasma robijnsii Bremek. - Zaïre (Congo-Kinshasa)

References

External links 
 Amphiasma in the World Checklist of Rubiaceae

Rubiaceae genera
Spermacoceae
Flora of Southern Africa